Kalindi College is located East Patel Nagar, New Delhi. The college is affiliated to University of Delhi.

History
The college had a beginning as ‘Government College Devnagar’; within a year the college was shifted to the present location, again a Government School building, in East Patel Nagar.

Programmes

Undergraduate
 Bachelor of Arts
 Bachelor of Commerce (Hons. and Programme)
 Bachelor of Science
Bachelor of vocational (Web Designing)
 Bachelor of Technology (discontinued)

Postgraduate
 Master of Arts

Notable alumni
Mayawati Chief minister of Uttar Pradesh

See also
Education in India
Literacy in India
List of institutions of higher education in Delhi

References

External links
 

Universities and colleges in Delhi
Delhi University
1967 establishments in Delhi
Educational institutions established in 1967